James Voss (born 22 July 1994) is an English professional rugby union player for Coventry in the RFU Championship. His usual position is lock.

Career

Voss made his debut for Jersey Reds in National League 1 as a 17 year old. He played 30 times in Jersey's first two campaigns in the RFU Championship before joining Hartpury College R.F.C. back in National League 1 in 2014. 

In 2016 Voss re-joined Jersey.  On 27 March 2018 Voss joined Leicester Tigers in Premiership Rugby with immediate effect.

Voss never played for Leicester and joined Championship side Coventry on a season-long loan for the 2018-19 season.  Voss then made the move to Coventry permanent in April 2019, signing a two-year contract.

References

1994 births
Living people
English rugby union players
Leicester Tigers players
Coventry R.F.C. players
Jersey Reds players
Rugby union locks
Rugby union players from London